This is a list of districts of Russia. A district (raion) is an administrative and municipal division of a federal subject of Russia.

Within the framework of administrative divisions, the administrative districts are on the same level of hierarchy as the cities of federal subject significance and may be further subdivided into towns of district significance, urban-type settlements of district significance, and selsoviets, although the exact terms for these entities vary from one federal subject to another.

Within the framework of municipal divisions, the municipal districts are on the same level of hierarchy as urban okrugs and are further subdivided into urban settlements, rural settlements, or both. Municipal districts are commonly formed within the boundaries of existing administrative districts, although in practice there are some exceptions to this rule.

Major Russian cities are divided into city districts. Despite a similarity in terminology, they are divisions of a different kind and are not within the scope of this article.

Unlike other federal subjects of Russia, the federal cities have the unique structure of the administrative-territorial divisions. The administrative-territorial divisions of the federal city of Moscow in particular include districts and settlements, which, in turn, are grouped into administrative okrugs. Only the districts are included below. However, as the districts of neither Moscow nor St. Petersburg include any inhabited localities, they do not have administrative centers.

The Republic of Crimea is a federal subject of Russia formed on the territory of the Crimean Peninsula, which is disputed between Russia and Ukraine. Within the Russian legal framework, the districts of the Autonomous Republic of Crimea (an administrative division of Ukraine) continue to be in use and are included in the tables below. The federal city of Sevastopol is also located on the peninsula, with its districts having a status similar to that of the districts of Moscow and St. Petersburg.

As of 2014, excluding Moscow, St. Petersburg, and Sevastopol, there are 1,873 administrative districts (including the 14 in the Republic of Crimea) and 1,823 municipal districts (also including the 14 in the Republic of Crimea) in Russia. All these districts have an administrative center, which is usually the same locality for both the administrative and municipal entity.

Administrative districts
The following tables list the administrative districts of the federal subjects and include their administrative center and population information. Unless otherwise noted, the administrative districts are municipally incorporated as municipal districts and the boundaries of the two entities are identical.

Republic of Adygea

Altai Krai

Altai Republic

Amur Oblast

Arkhangelsk Oblast

Astrakhan Oblast

Republic of Bashkortostan

Belgorod Oblast

Bryansk Oblast

Republic of Buryatia

Chechen Republic

Chelyabinsk Oblast

Chukotka Autonomous Okrug

Chuvash Republic

Republic of Crimea

Republic of Dagestan

Republic of Ingushetia

Irkutsk Oblast

Ivanovo Oblast

Jewish Autonomous Oblast

Kabardino-Balkar Republic

Kaliningrad Oblast

Republic of Kalmykia

Kaluga Oblast

Kamchatka Krai

Karachay-Cherkess Republic

Republic of Karelia

Note: the territory of the town of republic significance of Sortavala is incorporated as Sortavalsky Municipal District.

Kemerovo Oblast

Khabarovsk Krai

Republic of Khakassia

Khanty-Mansi Autonomous Okrug

Kirov Oblast

Komi Republic

Note: the territories of the towns of republic significance of Pechora, Sosnogorsk, and Vuktyl are incorporated, correspondingly, as Pechora, Sosnogorsk, and Vuktyl Municipal Districts.

Kostroma Oblast

Krasnodar Krai

Krasnoyarsk Krai

Kurgan Oblast

Kursk Oblast

Leningrad Oblast

Lipetsk Oblast

Magadan Oblast

Mari El Republic

Republic of Mordovia

Federal city of Moscow

Murmansk Oblast

Nenets Autonomous Okrug

Nizhny Novgorod Oblast

Republic of North Ossetia–Alania

Novgorod Oblast

Novosibirsk Oblast

Omsk Oblast

Orenburg Oblast

Oryol Oblast

Penza Oblast

Perm Krai

Note: the territories of the cities and towns of krai significance of Alexandrovsk, Chusovoy, Dobryanka, Gremyachinsk, Kizel, and Krasnokamsk are incorporated, correspondingly, as Alexandrovsky, Chusovskoy, Dobryansky, Gremyachinsky, Kizelovsky, and Krasnokamsky Municipal Districts.

Primorsky Krai

Pskov Oblast

Rostov Oblast

Ryazan Oblast

Federal city of Saint Petersburg

Sakha Republic

Sakhalin Oblast

Samara Oblast

Saratov Oblast

Federal city of Sevastopol

Smolensk Oblast

Stavropol Krai

Sverdlovsk Oblast

Tambov Oblast

Republic of Tatarstan

Tomsk Oblast

Tula Oblast

Tuva Republic

Tver Oblast

Tyumen Oblast

Udmurt Republic

Ulyanovsk Oblast

Vladimir Oblast

Volgograd Oblast

Vologda Oblast

Voronezh Oblast

Yamalo-Nenets Autonomous Okrug

Yaroslavl Oblast

Zabaykalsky Krai

References

Administrative divisions of Russia
Municipal divisions of Russia